Berezovka is a rural locality (a village) in Kananikolsky Selsoviet, Zilairsky District, Bashkortostan, Russia. The population was 77 as of 2010. There are 3 streets.

Geography 
Berezovka is located 90 km north of Zilair (the district's administrative centre) by road. Poboishche is the nearest rural locality.

References 

Rural localities in Zilairsky District